Damodaram Sanjivayya (14 February 1921 – 7 May 1972) was an Indian politician who served as the chief minister of United Andhra Pradesh from 11 January 1960 to 12 March 1962. Sanjivayya was the first Dalit Chief Minister of an Indian state.

Early life
Damodaram Sanjivayya was born in a Mala family in Peddapadu village of Kallur Mandal in Kurnool district. His father died when he was in young age. He studied at the Municipal School and he took a Bachelor's degree in Law from Madras Law College. Even being a student, he actively participated in the Indian freedom movement.

Career
Damodaram Sanjivayya was Minister in the composite Madras State. He was the member of the provisional parliament 1950–52. In 1962, Sanjivayya also became the first Dalit leader from Andhra Pradesh to become All India Congress Committee president.

He was Minister of Labour and Employment under Lal Bahadur Shastri between 9 June 1964 and 23 January 1966.

Chief Minister
Sanjivayya was the first Dalit Chief Minister of an Indian state.

He wrote a book on Labour problems and industrial development in India, in 1970 published by Oxford and IBH Pub. Co., New Delhi.
He introduced pension system for widows, elderly people,
he established Lalitha kala academy in Andhra pradesh,
he was the youngest chief minister ever in India, he introduced the office of Anticorruption Bureau {ACB}, he completed the irrigation projects like Gajuladinne in Kurnool dist., Vamsadhara, Pulichintala and varadarajula swamy project near Atmakur in Kurnool dist.

Honours
 His statue was erected opposite Public Gardens in Nampally, Hyderabad
 A park, Sanjeevaiah park on the banks of Hussain Sagar in Hyderabad was named in his honour. His grave is also located inside the park.
 Damodaram Sanjivayya National Law University, Visakhapatnam one of the premier legal institutions in the country has been named in his honour.
 India Post issued a commemorative postage stamp in his honour (INR 5.00) on 14 February 2008.

References

See also
 List of Chief Ministers of Andhra Pradesh

1921 births
1972 deaths
Chief Ministers of Andhra Pradesh
Telugu politicians
Chief ministers from Indian National Congress
Indian National Congress politicians from Andhra Pradesh
People from Kurnool district
Commerce and Industry Ministers of India